Henry Cowell's 1920 work Fabric, HC 307, is a short piano piece meant to be an exercise in a form of experimental rhythmic notation he had been developing at the time.

Background

It was written in the month of September 1922, with the complexity resulting from Cowell's preoccupation with rhythmic exploration and polyrhythmic tendencies. The piece is dedicated to Georgia Kober.

References

External links
 

20th-century classical music
1920 compositions
Compositions by Henry Cowell
Compositions for solo piano
Modernist compositions